Wilfredo Ramón Barrientos Valdés (born 29 July 1946), also known as Willy Barrientos, is a Chilean former football player who played as a forward for clubs in Chile and Central America.

Playing career
Barientos is a product of O'Higgins youth system, playing after for Colchagua and Chiprodal de Graneros, with whom he won the Campeonato Regional Zona Central.

He emigrated to Central America and spent ten years in Guatemala and five years in El Salvador. In El Salvador he played for both Sonsonate and Universidad de El Salvador.

Coaching career
Barrientos has developed an extensive career as coach of youth players, men and women, in the United States, also winning many titles in New York.

Personal life
He is the uncle of the former professional footballer and current coach Henry Barrientos, whom he suggested to move towards Central America at the end of 1989. In addition, his brother and Henry's father, served as director for O'Higgins.

Both Wilfredo and his nephew, Henry, were coached by the Chilean coach Rolando Torino.

Honours

As player
Xelajú MC
 Liga Nacional de Fútbol de Guatemala: 1980

References

External links
 Wilfredo Barrientos at PlaymakerStats.com
 Wilfredo Barrientos at ZeroZero.pt 

1946 births
Living people
Chilean footballers
Chilean expatriate footballers
Chilean Primera División players
O'Higgins F.C. footballers
Primera B de Chile players
Deportes Colchagua footballers
Salvadoran Primera División players
C.D. Sonsonate footballers
Liga Nacional de Fútbol de Guatemala players
Xelajú MC players
Chilean expatriate sportspeople in El Salvador
Chilean expatriate sportspeople in Guatemala
Expatriate footballers in El Salvador
Expatriate footballers in Guatemala
Association football forwards
Chilean football managers
Chilean expatriate football managers
Expatriate soccer managers in the United States
Chilean expatriate sportspeople in the United States